The Raven Crown (Dzongkha: དབུ་ཞྭ་བྱ་རོག་ཅན་; Wylie: dbu-zhva bya-rog-can) is worn by the Kings of Bhutan. It is a hat surmounted by the head of a raven.

History

The hereditary monarchy of the Wangchuck dynasty in the independent Himalayan State of Bhutan was established in 1907. The first king of the Wangchuck dynasty, Gongsar Ugyen Wangchuck (1862–1926), was a charismatic figure who came to power against a turbulent background of incessant and complex feuding in that chaotic warrior state.

He adopted as the unique symbol of his authority a satin and silk crown surmounted by the head of a raven. The bird represents a form of Mahakala, Bhutan's guardian deity. The prototype of the founding monarch's Raven Crown had first been devised as a battle helmet for his father, Jigme Namgyel (1825–1881). Known as the Black Ruler, he had worn it in bloody struggles against his many rivals within the country and against the British who tried, unsuccessfully, to subdue him.

The story of the Wangchuck dynasty's rise and triumph moves from a picture of turmoil and chaos to one of relative peace and stability.

The Raven Crown today is the official crown worn by the Kings of Bhutan. The raven is the national bird of Bhutan. The raven is known locally as Jaroq. At one time it was a capital crime to kill a raven in Bhutan.

Hereditary Kings of Bhutan 

His Majesty Ugyen Wangchuck (1st Druk Gyalpo)
His Majesty Jigme Wangchuck (2nd Druk Gyalpo)
His Majesty Jigme Dorji Wangchuck (3rd Druk Gyalpo)
His Majesty Jigme Singye Wangchuck (4th Druk Gyalpo)
His Majesty Jigme Khesar Namgyel Wangchuck (5th Druk Gyalpo)

References

Further reading

Bhutanese culture
Bhutanese monarchy
Crowns (headgear)